Justice Jaishanker Manilal Shelat (16 July 1908 – 1 November 1985) was a Judge of the Supreme Court of India from February 1966 to April 1973. Before that, he served as the third Chief Justice of the High Court of Gujarat serving from May 1963 till his elevation to the Supreme Court.

Education
Shelat initially studied at Jubilee Institution in Umreth. He got his Bachelor of Arts (Honours) in English literature from Elphinstone College, Bombay. Later, he went to King's College and the Institute of Historical Research of the University of London where his submitted his thesis on "Criticism and defence of the constitution of the Senate of the United States of America during the campaign for ratification 1787-1789."

Career
He joined the Bar at Inner Temple in 1933 and shifted to India soon after. Shelat became a Judge at the Bombay City Civil Court and an Additional Sessions Judge for Greater Bombay in September 1948. He was appointed an Additional Judge of the High Court of Bombay in January 1957 and made a Permanent Judge of the court in November that year.

Supersession and resignation
In April 1973, Shelat was the seniormost Supreme Court judge followed by A. N. Grover and K. S. Hegde who were superseded by Justice A. N. Ray in being named as the Chief Justice of India. This is partly attributed to their being on the side of the majority judgement in Kesavananda Bharati v. State of Kerala which went against the government of the day. Both Hegde and Shelat resigned from the court at the end of that month while Grover did so a month later.

Works

References

1908 births
20th-century Indian judges
20th-century Indian lawyers
20th-century Indian non-fiction writers
Chief Justices of the Gujarat High Court
Judges of the Bombay High Court
Justices of the Supreme Court of India
Alumni of the University of London
Elphinstone College alumni
Year of death missing